John Long Ltd was a publishing firm based in London and founded by John Long who died on 16 September 1935. John Long Ltd. had a long association with Hutchinson and was eventually incorporated, by the 1960s it had become an imprint of Hutchinson and was no longer in use after the year 1979.

References

Book publishing companies of the United Kingdom
Publishing companies based in London